RH, Rh, rH, or rh may refer to:

Companies
 Red Hat, an American software company
 Republic Express Airlines (IATA designator), a cargo airline in Indonesia
 RH (company), an American furniture chain formerly known as Restoration Hardware

Science and technology
 Relative humidity, the ratio of the partial pressure of water vapor to the equilibrium vapor pressure of water at a given temperature
 Releasing hormone
 Rh blood group system (Rhesus factor), a classification to describe blood types in humans
 Rhodium, symbol Rh, a chemical element
 RH, the Rydberg constant for hydrogen
 Riemann hypothesis, an important unsolved problem in mathematics

Places
 RH postcode area, in the UK
 , an official name of Croatia in Croatian

Other uses
 Rh (digraph)
 The Right Honourable, an honorific preceding a name in the UK
 Radical honesty, the practice of always being completely honest and refraining from telling even white lies

See also
 Royal Hospital (disambiguation)